Bernardo Repuyan (2 April 1928 – 14 November 2009) was a Filipino judoka. He competed in the men's middleweight event at the 1964 Summer Olympics.

References

External links
  

1928 births
2009 deaths
Filipino male judoka
Olympic judoka of the Philippines
Judoka at the 1964 Summer Olympics
Place of birth missing